Bozcaada Castle is a castle in the Turkish island of Bozcaada (known as Tenedos before the 15th century).

Geography
Visitors to the castle use the ferry line from Geyikli in the mainland (Anatolia) to the island. The castle is within walking distance from the ferry terminal.

History

There was a castle in the island before the 14th century, of undocumented construction and date: it was possibly built by the Phoenicians, Romans or Venetians. However, the castle was demolished after the War of Chioggia between Venice and Genoa on the advice of the Pope. When Mehmet II of the Ottoman Empire conquered the island in 1455 he rebuilt the castle. In July 1656, during the Cretan War, a Venice fleet commanded by Giacomo Loredano captured the castle. But Ottomans under Köprülü Mehmet Pasha recaptured the castle in August 1657. Soon after the reconquest, the castle underwent a great renewal. A second renewal was carried on in 1815 by the sultan Mahmut II.

Architecture
There are two sections; bailey and the citadel. There is a moat of  length and  width to the south of the castle. Within the citadel there are cisterns, an arsenal, an infirmary, a well, a mosque and various rooms. Formally The gate of the castle was a saracen gate over the moat.

References

Castles in Turkey
Tourist attractions in Çanakkale Province
History of Çanakkale Province
Buildings of Mehmed the Conqueror